Nicolas Wamba-Barzic (born 12 February 1988), is a French heavyweight boxer anf former kickboxer, former WKN World Super Heavyweight Kickboxing Champion, managed by WKN Top Team. As of 2017, he was ranked the #17 heavyweight in the world by GLORY. He is the son of Anaclet Wamba

Biography and career
He became the first La Nuit des Champions Heavyweight (+100 kg/220 lb) K-1 Rules Champion at La 20ème Nuit des Champions event in Marseille, France on 23 November 2013, defeating Daniel Sam. He took unanimous decision win, Sam was docked one point in first round for grabbing Wamba's leg, and Wamba scored a knockdown in third round when landed a high kick.

He challenged Raoumaru for the vacant World Kickboxing Network Kickboxing Rules Super Heavyweight World Championship on 22 March 2014 in Agde, France at 11th Trophee de l’Ephebe event. Wamba won the title by TKO as the referee stopped the fight in round 2.

He was knocked out by Jamal Ben Saddik in round two at Glory 16: Denver in Broomfield, Colorado, US on April 3, 2014.

He defeated Arnold Oborotov at Fight Night Saint-Tropez II in Saint-Tropez, France on August 4, 2014. Wamba earned a cut above right eye in first round, but defeated Oborotov via a spectacular right head-kick.

Wamba is expected to fight Jhonata Diniz of Brazil at Glory 42 Paris on June 10, 2017 in Paris, France.

Wamba defeated Jhonata Diniz of Brazil by a unanimous decision at Glory 42 Paris on June 10, 2017 in Paris, France.

He retired in February 2018 due to health issues.

Titles
Kickboxing - 28 wins, 7 losses
2017 WKN Intercontinental Kickboxing Rules Super Heavyweight Champion
2016 WKN European Kickboxing Rules Super Heavyweight Champion
2015 WKN Intercontinental Oriental Rules Super Heavyweight Champion 
2014 WKN Kickboxing Super Heavyweight World Champion +96.600 kg
2013 NDC K-1 Rules Heavyweight +100 kg Champion
2013 WKN Kickboxing Super Heavyweight European Champion
2011 K-1 Kick Tournament in Marseille Tournament Runner-up
2010 K-1 Kick Tournament in Marseille Tournament Champion
2009 Champions League K-1 Rules Tournament Runner up
Full Contact - 11 wins, 0 losses
2008 Champion de France 2008 +91 kg Elite classe A
2005, 2006 Junior Champion of France
2004, 2004 Junior Champion of French Cup
2004 W.A.K.O. World junior champion
Boxing 
Professional - 7 wins 0 Losses
 French Heavyweight Champion 2021
Amateur - 4 wins, 2 losses
2006 Junior French Championship Runner up
Hybrid Boxing / Kickboxing rules
2012 Bigger's Better 10 in Moulineaux, France Tournament Semifinalist
2011 Bigger's Better King in Varaždin, Croatia Tournament Semifinalist
2011 Bigger's Better 8 in Lisbon, Portugal Tournament Champion

Kickboxing record

|-
|-  bgcolor="#cfc"
| 2022-11-19 || Win ||align=left| Mehmet Ozer || Kick's Night 2022 || Agde, France || Decision (Unanimous)|| 3 ||3:00 
|-
|-  bgcolor="#cfc"
| 2017-06-10 || Win ||align=left| Jhonata Diniz || Glory 42: Paris|| Paris, France || Decision (unanimous)  || 3 || 3:00
|-
|-  style="background:#cfc;"
| 2017-05-12 || Win ||align=left| Kocjan Lukasz || TEKB 14  || Cap d'Agde, France || KO || 3 || 
|-
! style=background:white colspan=9 |
|-
|-  style="background:#cfc;"
| 2016-11-05 || Win ||align=left| Nordine Mahieddine || Glory 35: Nice || Nice, France || Decision (Unanimous) || 3 || 3:00  
|-
|-  style="background:#cfc;"
| 2016-06-11 || Win ||align=left| Michal Reissinger || 13th Trophee de l’Ephebe || Cap d'Agde, France || Decision (Unanimous) || 5 || 3:00
|-
! style=background:white colspan=9 |
|-
|-  style="background:#fbb;"
| 2016-04-16 || Loss ||align=left| Ondřej Hutník || Simply the Best 10 Prague || Prague, Czech Republic || KO (Punch) || 3 || 
|-
! style=background:white colspan=9 |
|-
|-  style="background:#fbb;"
| 2015-11-07 || Loss ||align=left| Tarik Khbabez || SUPERKOMBAT World Grand Prix 2015 Final, Semifinals || Bucharest, Romania || Decision (Unanimous) || 3 || 3:00 
|-  style="background:#cfc;"
| 2015-10-10 || Win ||align=left| Yuksel Ayaydin || World GBC Tour 9 || Mazan, France || Decision || 3 || 3:00
|-  style="background:#cfc;"
| 2015-05-23 || Win ||align=left| Petr Vondráček || Simply the Best 4 || Usti nad Labem, Czech Republic || Decision || 3 || 3:00
|-
! style=background:white colspan=9 |
|-  style="background:#fbb;"
| 2014-11-22 || Loss ||align=left| Mladen Brestovac || La 21ème Nuit des Champions || Marseille, France || TKO (Injury) || 2 ||  
|-
! style=background:white colspan=9 |
|-  style="background:#cfc;"
| 2014-08-04 || Win ||align=left| Arnold Oborotov || Fight Night Saint-Tropez II  || Saint-Tropez, France || KO (Right High Kick) || 2 ||  
|-  style="background:#fbb;"
| 2014-05-03 || Loss ||align=left| Jamal Ben Saddik || Glory 16: Denver || Broomfield, Colorado, USA || TKO (left hook) || 2 || 1:24
|-  style="background:#cfc;"
| 2014-03-22 || Win ||align=left| Raoumaru ||11th Trophee de l’Ephebe || Agde, France || TKO (Referee Stop.) || 2 || 
|-
! style=background:white colspan=9 |
|-  style="background:#cfc;"
| 2013-11-23 || Win ||align=left| Daniel Sam || La 20ème Nuit des Champions || Marseille, France || Decision (Unanimous) || 3 || 3:00 
|-
! style=background:white colspan=9 |
|-  style="background:#cfc;"
| 2013-10-11 || Win ||align=left| Pacôme Assi || Warriors Night 2 || France || Decision || 3 || 3:00
|-  style="background:#cfc;"
| 2013-08-04 || Win||align=left| Stefan Leko ||Fight Night|| Saint Tropez, France  ||KO  ||4 
|2:00
|-  style="background:#cfc;"
| 2013-05-25 || Win||align=left| Enver Šljivar ||10th Nuit des Sports de Combat || Geneva, Switzerland ||Decision ||3 ||3:00 
|-  style="background:#cfc;"
| 2013-03-30 ||Win ||align=left| Sergej Maslobojev || || Agde, France ||Decision || 5|| 2:00
|-
! style=background:white colspan=9 |
|-  style="background:#cfc;"
| 2011-06-11 || Win ||align=left| Frank Muñoz || 8e Nuit des Sports de Combat || Geneva, Switzerland || Decision || 5 || 2:00
|-  style="background:#fbb;"
| 2011-05-27 || Loss ||align=left| Fabrice Aurieng || K-1 Kick Tournament in Marseille, Final || Marseille, France || Decision || 3 || 3:00
|-
! style=background:white colspan=9 |
|-  style="background:#cfc;"
| 2011-05-27 || Win ||align=left| David Assienne Boyomo || K-1 Kick Tournament in Marseille, Semifinals || Marseille, France || Decision || 3 ||3:00
|-  style="background:#cfc;"
| 2011-03-19|| Win||align=left| Noredine Mahieddine || 8e TEKB Vainqueur Trophée de l'Ephèbe || Le Cap d'Agde, France  ||TKO (Doctor Stop.)||4|| 2:00
|-  style="background:#fbb;"
| 2011-05-07 || Loss ||align=left| Stéphane Susperregui || 7e Nuit des Sports de Combat, Final || Geneva, Switzerland || TKO (doctor stoppage) || 2 || 
|-
! style=background:white colspan=9 |
|-  style="background:#cfc;"
| 2011-05-07 || Win ||align=left| Vjekoslav Bajić || 7e Nuit des Sports de Combat, Semifinals || Geneva, Switzerland || TKO (doctor stoppage) || 2 ||
|-  style="background:#cfc;"
| 2010-03-13|| Win ||align=left| Yan Thomas || 7e TEKB Vainqueur Trophée de l'Ephèbe  || Le Cap d'Agde, France  ||TKO||4|| 2:00
|-  style="background:#cfc;"
| 2010-01-29 || Win ||align=left| Fabrice Aurieng || K-1 Kick Tournament in Marseille, Final || Marseille, France || Decision || 3 || 3:00
|-
! style=background:white colspan=9 |
|-  style="background:#cfc;"
| 2010-01-29 || Win ||align=left| Cyril Nicolas Ascencio || K-1 Kick Tournament in Marseille, Semifinals || Marseille, France || Decision || 3 ||3:00
|-  style="background:#fbb;"
| 2009-01-29 || Loss ||align=left| Humberto Evora || Champions League, Final  || Lisbon, Portugal || Decision (Split) || 3 ||3:00
|-
! style=background:white colspan=9 |
|-  style="background:#cfc;"
| 2009-01-29 || Win ||align=left| Ismael Londt || Champions League, Semifinals || Lisbon, Portugal || Decision (Split) || 3 ||3:00
|-  style="background:#fbb;"
| 2008-10-30 || Loss ||align=left| Pavel Zhuravlev || WBKF European Tournament (+93 kg) @ Club Arbat, semifinals || Moscow, Russia || Decision (Unanimous) || 3 || 3:00 
|-
| colspan=9 | Legend:

Professional boxing record

See also
List of male kickboxers

References

1988 births
Living people
French male kickboxers
Heavyweight kickboxers
Glory kickboxers
SUPERKOMBAT kickboxers